The Coolpix P5000 is a compact digital camera produced by Nikon. In 2007, it won the TIPA award for Best Compact Digital Camera and the American Photo Editor's Choice award. The P5000 was released in March 2007.

References

External links
 Official webpage
 Nikon Coolpix P5000, Digital Photography Review.

P5000
Cameras introduced in 2007